Hydropark is a type of park, located in the coastal zone, with the water parks. Known in several cities in Ukraine.

 Hydropark in Kyiv - the island and the park in Kyiv
 Hydropark in Kherson - the park in Kherson
 Luzanivka Hydropark - the park in Odessa, in Luzanivka quarter
 Topilche Hydropark - the park in Ternopil
 Zhytomyr Hydropark - the park in Zhytomyr

Other uses
 Hydropark (Kyiv Metro), a metro station in Kyiv, located in Hydropark
 Hydropark Arena, a stadium in Hydropark in Kyiv